The third in the line of succession for the lordship of Tebnine. He was son of Humphrey II of Toron. Little is known about him as his rule lasted for a short while and the lordship went to his son Humphrey IV of Toron. 
Under Humphrey III, Toron issued its own coinage, which did not survive the test of time.

He married Stephanie of Milly and had issue:
 Isabella of Toron, married to Ruben III, Prince of Armenia and had issue:
 Alice of Armenia, married to Raymond IV, Count of Tripoli.
 Philippa of Armenia, married to Theodore I Laskaris Roman Emperor in Nicaea.
 Humphrey IV of Toron, married to Isabella I of Jerusalem.

References

Lords of Toron
Lords of Oultrejordain